The Matyra is a river in the Tambov and Lipetsk oblasts of Russia. It is a left tributary of the river Voronezh (in the Don's drainage basin). The town of Gryazi is along the Matyra.

A reservoir was created on the river in 1976.

References 

Rivers of Lipetsk Oblast
Rivers of Tambov Oblast